Total Devastation: The Best of Busta Rhymes is a greatest hits album by American hip-hop artist Busta Rhymes. It received a score of five out of five from Allmusic. It includes songs from his four platinum albums, "Turn It Up (Remix)/Fire It Up" and two songs from the 1991 LP A Future Without a Past recorded with his hip-hop group Leaders of the New School. The compilation in this form is a US exclusive; in the rest of the world (namely Europe, Germany and Australia), it was released in altered form by Warner Music Group and re-titled Turn It Up! The Very Best of Busta Rhymes.

Track listings

Total Devastation

Turn It Up!

References

2001 greatest hits albums
Busta Rhymes albums
Albums produced by Swizz Beatz
Albums produced by DJ Scratch
Albums produced by Nottz
Albums produced by Rashad Smith
Albums produced by Easy Mo Bee
Elektra Records compilation albums
Conglomerate (record label) compilation albums
Warner Music Group compilation albums